The Battle of Khatoli was fought in 1517 between the Lodi dynasty under Ibrahim Lodi and the Kingdom of Mewar under Rana Sanga, during which Mewar emerged victorious.

Battle
On the death of Sikander Lodi in 1518, his son Ibrahim Lodi succeeded him as the new Sultan of the Lodi dynasty in the Delhi Sultanate. He was engaged in putting down the revolts of his nobles, when news of Rana Sanga’s encroachments reached him. He prepared an army and marched against Mewar. Rana Sanga also had prepared a large army of Rajput warriors and had advanced to meet him and the two armies met near the village of Khatoli on the borders of Haravati (Haraoti) in present-day Lakheri, 
Rajasthan. Ibrahim Lodi's army could not stand the onslaught of the Rajputs, and after a fight lasting two pahars (five hours), the Sultan's army gave way and fled, followed by the Sultan himself, leaving a Lodi prince prisoner in the hands of Rana Sanga. The prince was released after a few days, on payment of a ransom. In this battle, Rana Sanga lost an arm by a sword cut, and an arrow also hit him in the leg which made him lame for life.

Aftermath
The resources of Ibrahim were depleted by this war with Sanga so he could not renew the contest for some time. However, he sought vengeance on Maharana Sanga for the disastrous defeat inflicted by the Rana Sanga at Khatoli. And when the rebellion of Islam Khan, which had assumed serious proportions, was suppressed, the Sultan Ibrahim Lodi prepared another large army to attack Mewar, but was once again defeated by the Rajputs and Rana Sanga's forces in the Battle of Dholpur.

References

History of Rajasthan
Khatoli
Khatoli
Khatoli
Khatoli